The Aurora house snake, Aurora snake, or night snake (Lamprophis aurora) is a species of snake in the family Colubridae. It is endemic to Southern Africa (South Africa, Lesotho, Eswatini, Botswana).

Distribution
This species is widespread in South Africa (present all provinces but is absent from most of the Northern Cape) and also occurs in Lesotho and Eswatini. It is also recorded from eastern Botswana, although this might represent a translocation.

Description
The snake can achieve a maximum length of 90 cm, but averages 45–60 cm. Colour varies from shiny olive green to dull dark green above. A bright yellow to orange vertebral stripe runs from the top of the head to the tip of the tail.

Habitat and ecology
They are often found near streams and under rocks, and may occur in old termitaria.

It is secretive but can be locally common. It is active at night (nocturnal). The diet consists of rodents, lizards, and frogs. The female lays clutches of up to 12 eggs. It is non-venomous and seldom attempts to bite.

Conservation
Grassland habitats that this species inhabits are heavily transformed by urban development and agriculture, but it is not considered threatened because it remains common in suitable habitat and is widespread. Its range overlaps with a number of protected areas.

References

Lamprophis
Snakes of Africa
Reptiles of Botswana
Reptiles of Eswatini
Reptiles of Lesotho
Reptiles of South Africa
Taxa named by Carl Linnaeus
Reptiles described in 1758